Naomi is an American superhero drama television series created by Ava DuVernay and Jill Blankenship which is based on the comic book series of the same name co-written by Brian Michael Bendis and David F. Walker and illustrated by Jamal Campbell. It premiered on The CW on January 11, 2022, and concluded on May 10, 2022. In May 2022, the series was canceled after one season.

Plot 
Naomi McDuffie is a comic book-loving teenager and the host of a Superman fan website. After a supernatural event occurs in Port Oswego, Oregon, Naomi sets out to determine its origins with help from her best friend, her supporting adoptive parents, and a tattoo shop owner with a secret origin.

Cast and characters

Main

 Kaci Walfall as Naomi McDuffie, an intelligent, confident comic book-loving teenager who discovers she has powers
 Cranston Johnson as Zumbado, the owner of a local car lot with a hidden agenda who eventually becomes an ally to Naomi
 Alexander Wraith as Dee, a local tattoo store owner who is a Thanagarian and serves as Naomi's mentor
 Mary-Charles Jones as Annabelle, Naomi's loyal best friend
 Mouzam Makkar as Jennifer McDuffie, Naomi's adoptive mother who is a linguist
 Daniel Puig as Nathan, a jock who is Naomi's ex-boyfriend
 Camila Moreno as Lourdes, a young woman and comic book enthusiast with a sarcastic sense of humor who works in a vintage collectibles shop and has a crush on Naomi
 Will Meyers as Anthony, a townie in Port Oswego who is Naomi's friend but has a crush on her
 Aidan Gemme as Jacob, Annabelle's loyal boyfriend and a UFO enthusiast
 Barry Watson as Greg McDuffie, Naomi's adoptive father and an active duty military officer

Recurring

 Stephanie March as Akira, an old colleague of Zumbado
	
In addition, Alie Urquhart costars as Esme Brooks, class president of Port Oswego High school and Naomi's rival while Brian Brightman co-stars as Commander Steel, a U.S. Military Commander based in Port Oswego.

Guest
 Chase Anderson as Adam Blake, a superhero with a hipster personality that knows Dee
 Ray Porter as Brutus

Episodes

Production

Development
On December 4, 2020, it was reported that Ava DuVernay and Jill Blankenship are developing a series for The CW based on the comic book series Naomi, co-written by Brian Bendis and David F. Walker and illustrated by Jamal Campbell. On February 9, 2021, The CW gave the production a pilot order. On May 24, 2021, Naomi was picked up to series. The series is created by DuVernay and Jill Blankenship who are expected to executive produce alongside Sarah Bremner and Paul Garnes. The pilot is written by DuVernay and directed by Amanda Marsalis. The production companies involved with the series are Array Filmworks and Warner Bros. Television. The series premiered on January 11, 2022. On May 12, 2022, The CW canceled the series after one season.

Casting
In March 2021, Kaci Walfall was cast in the titular role while Alexander Wraith, Cranston Johnson, Camila Moreno, Barry Watson, Mouzam Makkar, Mary-Charles Jones, Aidan Gemme, Daniel Puig and Will Meyers were also tapped as series regulars. In December 2021, Stephanie March joined the cast in a guest starring role. In January 2022, Chase Anderson was cast in an undisclosed capacity.

Filming
Principal photography for the series began on August 23, 2021, in Georgia. Cliff Charles is a cinematographer while DeMane Davis is a director for the series.

International release
In Latin America, Naomi premiered on HBO Max on January 27, 2022.  In Scandinavia, it premiered on HBO Max on February 3, 2022.

Reception

Critical response
The review aggregator website Rotten Tomatoes reported a 91% approval rating with an average rating of 7/10, based on 27 critic reviews. The website's critics consensus reads, "Kaci Walfall proves a plucky enough heroine to give the deliberately-paced Naomi its own super-powered charm." Metacritic, which uses a weighted average, assigned a score of 72 out of 100 based on 9 critics, indicating "generally favorable reviews".

Ratings

According to Samba TV, 313,000 U.S. households streamed the premiere on the first day of availability.

Notes

References

External links
 
 
 

2020s American black television series
2020s American drama television series
2020s American science fiction television series
2022 American television series debuts
2022 American television series endings
American black superhero television shows
Fiction about superhuman features or abilities
The CW original programming
Teen superhero television series
Television series about teenagers
Television shows based on DC Comics
Television series by Warner Bros. Television Studios
Television shows filmed in Georgia (U.S. state)
Television shows set in Oregon